The 1989 Lorraine Open was a men's tennis tournament played on indoor carpet courts in Nancy, France, and was part of the 1989 Nabisco Grand Prix. The tournament took place from 27 February through 5 March 1989. It was the 11th and final edition of the tournament. Third-seeded Guy Forget won the singles title.

Finals

Singles

 Guy Forget defeated  Michiel Schapers 6–3, 7–6(7–5)
 It was Forget's only singles title of the year and the second of his career.

Doubles

 Udo Riglewski /  Tobias Svantesson defeated  João Cunha e Silva /  Eduardo Masso 6–4, 6–7, 7–6
 It was Riglewski's 1st title of the year and the 3rd of his career. It was Svantesson's 1st title of the year and the 1st of his career.

References

External links
 ITF tournament edition details

Lorraine Open
Lorraine Open
Lorraine Open